Bramerton is a village in South Norfolk 4¾ miles (7½ km) south-east of Norwich, just north of the main A146 Norwich-Lowestoft road and on the south bank of the River Yare.

Geography
In the 2001 census it contained 158 households and a population of 350, the population falling to 301 at the 2011 census.

History
Bramerton's derives from the Old English for a farmstead with abundant bramble or thicket.

The Domesday Book lists Bramerton as a settlement of 25 households belonging to William the Conqueror, Odo of Bayeux, Roger Bigod of Norfolk and Godric the Steward.

St Peter's Church is of Medieval origin and was extensively restored first in the 1460s and later in the 1860s, it is also Grade II listed.

Bramerton Hall, located on the corner of The Street and Surlingham Lane, was built in the 1830s and is also Grade II listed.

In the 1920s, a Lychgate for St Peter's Church was created by John Shingles using oak wood from local trees.

Amenities
Bramerton's post office closed in 1968 alongside the village shop in 1977 and the school in 1978. However 'The Water's Edge' public house is still in operation and was previously known as 'Woods End'.

At the north end of the village is a Dawn Christadelphian Hall, first opened in 1952 and extended in the 1960s and then again in the 1980s. A secondary hall for youth activities was added in the 2000s.

Bramerton Health Care Clinic offers homoeopathy, herbal supplements and dietary advice.

Bramerton Pits

The rock strata reaching the surface at Bramerton Pits, adjacent to the Common at Woods End, have resulted in the name of the village being given to an early Pleistocene glacial stage in the geological pre-history of the British Isles. The Bramertonian Stage is distinguished by the presence of shelly, sandy deposits indicative of a temperate climate. Bramerton Pits has been noted as a Site of Special Scientific Interest on account of the geology and has been excavated on several occasions.

Woods End

There has been an inn on the site since before 1700. In 1828 the area and the nearby river were painted by Joseph Stannard, prominent in the Norwich School; entitled Boats on the Yare near Bramerton, Norfolk, his painting is now in the Fitzwilliam Museum in Cambridge. In Victorian times the inn possessed tea rooms and gardens popular with river-borne day-trippers from Norwich. 

The Woods End is still a popular spot for the mooring of pleasure craft and is also one of the few places on the Norfolk Broads where water skiing is allowed. Outside the pub (now renamed the Water's Edge) is a statue of Billy Bluelight (William Cullum), who in the 1920s–30s used to challenge boat trippers to a race along the river bank. He is famed for his claim... "My name is Billy Bluelight, my age is 45, I hope to get to Carrow Bridge before the boat arrive." He is said to have remained '45' for many years.

Sports and recreation

Bramerton and District Bowls club was founded in 1965, moving to its current location near the village hall in 1972. The village hall itself was erected by voluntary labour in 1988 after having been rescued from its previous existence as a Surlingham bungalow. The village hall is now the venue for a range of activities including a play group called Sunbeams, Brownies and yoga.

Adjacent to the Bowls club is a children's playground with swings, climbing frame and slide. At Grange Farm Barns in the centre of the village is a Caravan Club certified location.

Transport
Bramerton is served by bus route 85 operated by Our Bus providing nine services a day into Norwich via Kirby Bedon and to the neighbouring villages of Surlingham and Rockland St Mary.

National Cycle Route 1 passes through Bramerton on its route from Norwich via Trowse and Whitlingham and out to Loddon via Surlingham.

The Wherryman's Way, a long distance footpath, passes close by at Woods End.

War Memorial
Bramerton's War Memorial is a stone Celtic cross located in St Peter's Churchyard. It bears the following names for the First World War:
 Brevet Lieutenant-Colonel John D. M. Beckett (1881-1918), 10th Battalion, Hampshire Regiment
 Lance-Corporal Harry E. Doggett (d.1916), 8th Battalion, Border Regiment
 Lance-Corporal H. S. Hayes (1890-1916), 9th Battalion, Royal Norfolk Regiment
 Lance-Corporal Frederic W. Perfitt (1894-1918), 11th Battalion, Sherwood Foresters
 Leading-Stoker John H. Osborne (d.1914), HMS Hogue
 Private John P. Debbage (d.1915), 1st Battalion, Essex Regiment
 Private Percy W. Norman (1894-1916), 10th Battalion, Essex Regiment
 Private Samuel J. Daynes (d.1917), 1/4th Battalion, Royal Norfolk Regiment
 Private Arthur S. Frost (1897-1916), 8th Battalion, Royal Norfolk Regiment
 Private W. A. Daynes (d.1919), Royal Norfolk Regiment

References

External links

Villages in Norfolk
South Norfolk
Civil parishes in Norfolk